Studiestræde 21 is a Neoclassical property in the Latin Quarter of Copenhagen, Denmark. The building was listed on the Danish registry of protected buildings and places in 1951,

History
The building was constructed in 1797 by master builder Carl Christian Martens after the previous building at the site had been destroyed in the Copenhagen Fire of 1795.

The building was from circa 1909 home to a distillery,  Weile & Springer, whose owners also owned the building. The Icelandic scholar Finnur Magnusson was a resident in the building in around 1820. The building and distillery  was later owned by J. F. Christensen. His distillery closed in 1888 as the last of the many small distilleries in the city's North Quarter.

The brothers Christen and P. M. Daell from Aalborg established a mail order business on the first floor on 12 January 1910. The venture was an immediate success and soon had to move to larger premises at Nørregade 12. It would later develop into the department store Daells Varehus.

Furniture maker Jacob Kjær operated a furniture workshop in the courtyard from 1928 to 1950. He created the furniture for the Danish pavilion at the 1929 Barcelona International Exposition. Some of his works are now owned by the Danish Design Museum.

The building was in 1994-95 acquired by Mødrehjælpen for DKK 6 millions.

Architecture
The building consists of four storeys over a raised cellar. The fourth storey was added in 1890. The building is give bays wide and the two outer bays are slightly projecting compared to the three central ones. The gate is topped by a fanlight.

Today
Tea:licious, a café specializing in tea, is based in the basement.

References

External links
 Source

Listed buildings and structures in Copenhagen
Buildings and structures completed in 1797